Arno Klaassen (born 16 November 1979, in Tilburg) is a Dutch bobsledder. Klaassen started with international bobsleigh competitions in 2005 and therefore was not yet part of Arend Glas's team that participated at the 2002 Winter Olympics in Salt Lake City. However, from 2005 on his skills improved fast and he became a regular member of the 4-bob. In January 2006 Klaassen qualified himself in the team of that several weeks earlier secured its qualification for the 2006 Winter Olympics in Turin. At the qualification play-off (named bob-off) held in Oberhof, Germany he ended up in second position (behind Sybren Jansma), thus claiming his seat in the bob. Together with Glas, Jansma and Vincent Kortbeek he became 16th.

External links 
 BSBN.nl

1982 births
Living people
Dutch male bobsledders
Bobsledders at the 2006 Winter Olympics
Bobsledders at the 2014 Winter Olympics
Olympic bobsledders of the Netherlands
Sportspeople from Tilburg
21st-century Dutch people